Partula mirabilis, common name the Moorean viviparous tree snail, is a species of air-breathing tropical land snail, a terrestrial pulmonate gastropod mollusk in the family Partulidae. This species was endemic to the island of Moorea, French Polynesia. It is now extinct in the wild.

Subspecies 
Subspecies of this species included:
 Partula mirabilis propinqua Crampton, 1932

References

Partula (gastropod)
Taxonomy articles created by Polbot
Mo'orea
Gastropods described in 1924